Babault's mouse shrew (Myosorex babaulti) is a species of mammal in the family Soricidae found in Burundi, the Democratic Republic of the Congo, and Uganda. Its natural habitat is subtropical or tropical moist montane forests.

References

Myosorex
Mammals of the Democratic Republic of the Congo
Mammals of Burundi
Taxonomy articles created by Polbot
Mammals described in 1956